The shooting Competitions at the 2014 South American Games took place at the Polideportivo Viña in Viña del Mar, Chile from March 12 to 18. There were 14 competitions, nine for men and five for women. The winner of each tournament qualifies to compete at the 2015 Pan American Games in Toronto, Canada, with each athlete only able to claim one quota.

Medal summary

Men's events
Athletes in bold have qualified a quota for the 2015 Pan American Games

Women's events

References

2014 South American Games events
Qualification tournaments for the 2015 Pan American Games
South American Games
2014
Shooting competitions in Chile